Mirik is a village in the Lachin District of Azerbaijan.

History 

The village came under the control of ethnic Armenian forces during the First Nagorno-Karabakh War in the early 1990s. The village subsequently became part of the breakaway Republic of Artsakh as part of its Kashatagh Province, located in the Armenian-occupied territories surrounding Nagorno-Karabakh. It was returned to Azerbaijan as part of the 2020 Nagorno-Karabakh ceasefire agreement.

Historical heritage sites 
Historical heritage sites in and around the village include the church of Surb Astvatsatsin built in 1682, and tombstones from the 17th century.

Geography 
The village is located on the left bank of the Minkend branch of the Hakari River, 2 km to the west of the village of Bozlu, at an altitude of 1,440-1,520 meters above sea level. Rivers that flow through the village include the rivers of Mirik, Dalikli, and the Minkend branch of the Hakari River.

References

External links 
 

Villages in Azerbaijan
Populated places in Lachin District